It is a list of actors who have participated in the telenovela Marido en alquiler.

Cast

Main

Supporting cast

Minor role

References 

Lists of actors by soap opera television series